Events from the year 1942 in the United States.

Incumbents

Federal Government 
 President: Franklin D. Roosevelt (D-New York)
 Vice President: Henry A. Wallace (D-Iowa)
 Chief Justice: Harlan F. Stone (New York)
 Speaker of the House of Representatives: Sam Rayburn (D-Texas)
 Senate Majority Leader: Alben W. Barkley (D-Kentucky)
 Congress: 77th

Events

January
 January 1 
Sales of new cars are banned to save steel.
WWII: The United States and Philippines troops fight the Battle of Bataan.
 January 10 – WWII: The last German air-raid on the English port of Liverpool destroys the home of William Patrick Hitler, Adolf Hitler's nephew. William Hitler is in the United States and later joins the navy to fight against his uncle.
 January 14–15 – WWII: Operation Drumbeat – German submarine U-123 under the command of Reinhard Hardegen sinks a Norwegian tanker within sight of Long Island before entering New York Harbor and sinking a British tanker off Sandy Hook as she leaves heading south along the East Coast.
 January 16 – Film actress Carole Lombard and her mother are among all 22 aboard TWA Flight 3 & are killed when the Douglas DC-3 plane crashes into Potosi Mountain near Las Vegas in Nevada while she is returning from a tour to promote the sale of war bonds.
 January 19
WWII: Japanese forces invade Burma.
The United States VIII Bomber Command, later to become the Eighth Air Force, is established in Savannah, Georgia.
 January 25 – WWII: Thailand declares war on the United States and United Kingdom.
 January 26 – WWII: The first American forces arrive in Europe, landing in Northern Ireland.

February

 February 2 – WWII: President Franklin D. Roosevelt signs an executive order directing the internment of Japanese Americans and the seizure of their property.
 February 7 – President Roosevelt signs an Executive Order creating the War Shipping Administration (WSA).
 February 8 
WWII: Top United States military leaders hold their first formal meeting to discuss American military strategy in the war.
Daylight saving time goes into effect in the United States.
 February 9 – WWII: The ocean liner  catches fire while being converted into the troopship USS Lafayette at pier 88 in New York City. In the early hours of February 10 she capsizes.
 February 18 – WWII: More than 200 American sailors die in Newfoundland when the  runs aground near Chambers Cove and the  runs aground at Lawn Point.
 February 19 – President Franklin D. Roosevelt signs executive order 9066 allowing the United States military to define areas as exclusionary zones. These zones affect the Japanese on the West Coast, and Germans and Italians primarily on the East Coast.
 February 20 – Lieutenant Edward O'Hare becomes America's first World War II flying ace.
 February 22 – WWII: President Roosevelt orders General Douglas MacArthur out of the Philippines as American defense of the nation collapses.
 February 23 – WWII: The Japanese submarine I-17 fires 17 high-explosive shells toward an oil refinery near Santa Barbara, California, causing little damage.
 February 24 – The Voice of America begins broadcasting.
 February 25 – Battle of Los Angeles: Over 1,400 AA shells are fired at an unidentified, slow-moving object in the skies over Los Angeles. The appearance of the object triggers an immediate wartime blackout over most of Southern California, with thousands of air raid wardens being deployed throughout the city. In total there are 6 deaths. Despite the several hour barrage no planes are downed.
 February 26 – The 14th Academy Awards ceremony, hosted by Bob Hope is held at Biltmore Hotel in Los Angeles, with John Ford's How Green Was My Valley winning Outstanding Motion Picture along with four other awards, including a third Best Director win for Ford. The two aforementioned awards are currently considered controversial due to the retroactive high regard placed on Orson Welles' also-nominated Citizen Kane.

March
 March – Construction begins on the Badger Army Ammunition Plant (the largest in the United States during WWII).
 March 9 – WWII: Executive order 9082 (February 28, 1942) reorganizes the United States Army into three major commands: Army Ground Forces, Army Air Forces, and Services of Supply, later redesignated Army Service Forces.

April
April 3 – WWII: Japanese forces begin an all-out assault on the United States and Filipino troops on the Bataan Peninsula.

May
 May 6 – WWII: On Corregidor, the last American and Filipino forces in the Philippines surrender to the Japanese.
 May 14 – Aaron Copland's Lincoln Portrait is performed for the first time by the Cincinnati Symphony Orchestra.
 May 15 – WWII: In the United States, a bill creating the Women's Auxiliary Army Corps (WAAC) is signed into law.
 May 20 – The first African-American seamen are taken into the United States Navy.

June
 June 4–7 – WWII: Battle of Midway – The United States Navy defeats an Imperial Japanese Navy attack against Midway Atoll.
 June 7 – WWII: Aleutian Islands Campaign – Japanese forces invade the Aleutian Islands of Alaska.
 June 13
 The United States opens its Office of War Information, a propaganda center.
 Office of Strategic Services (OSS) is created.
 June 21 – WWII: Bombardment of Fort Stevens – Fort Stevens, Oregon is fired upon by a Japanese submarine.

July
 July 4 – WWII in the European Theater of Operations: US Eighth Air Force flies its first inauspicious mission in Europe using borrowed British planes; six aircraft went out, only three came back.
July 19 – WWII – Battle of the Atlantic: German Grand Admiral Karl Dönitz orders the last U-boats to withdraw from their United States Atlantic coast positions, in response to an effective American convoy system.
July 30 – WWII: A bill creating the United States Marine Corps Women's Reserve is signed into law.

August

 August 7 – WWII: Battle of Guadalcanal begins – USMC initiate the first American offensive of the war with a landing on Guadalcanal in the Solomon Islands.
 August 8 – WWII: In Washington, DC, six German would-be saboteurs are executed (two others were cooperative and received life imprisonment instead).
 August 13 – Walt Disney's fifth feature film, Bambi, is released. Although the initial box office gross is lackluster (due to the loss of most of the European film market during World War II), it eventually becomes a financial success through various reissues over the next several decades. Due to continued financial losses, Disney spent the majority of the rest of the 1940s producing a string of package films, with Bambi being the last singular project he would release until Cinderella eight years later.
 August 15 – WWII: The American tanker SS Ohio reaches Malta as part of the convoy of Operation Pedestal.
 August 16 – The U.S. Navy blimp L-8 (Flight 101) comes ashore near San Francisco, eventually coming down in Daly City (the crew is missing).

September
 September 9 – WWII: A Japanese floatplane drops incendiary devices at Mount Emily, near Brookings, Oregon, in the first of two "Lookout Air Raids", the first bombing of the continental United States.
 September 15 – The Women's Flying Training Detachment (WFTD) is established.
 September 21 – Boeing B-29 Superfortress bomber prototype first flies, from Boeing Field, Seattle.
 September 27 – WWII: Both the commerce raiding German auxiliary cruiser Stier and American Liberty ship  sink following a gun battle in the South Atlantic. Hilfskreuzer Stier is the only commerce raider to be sunk by a defensively equipped merchant ship.

October

 October 5 – The St. Louis Cardinals defeat the New York Yankees, 4 games to 1, to win their 4th World Series Title.
 October 11 – WWII – Battle of Cape Esperance: On the northwest coast of Guadalcanal, United States Navy ships intercept and defeat a Japanese fleet on their way to reinforce troops on the island.
 October 23 – Award-winning composer and Hollywood songwriter Ralph Rainger ("Thanks for the Memory") is among 12 people killed in the mid-air collision between an American Airlines DC-3 airliner and a U.S. Army bomber near Palm Springs, California.
 October 26 – WWII – Battle of the Santa Cruz Islands: Two Japanese aircraft carriers are heavily damaged and one U.S. carrier is sunk.
 October 28 – The Alaska Highway is completed.

November

 November 8 – Operation Torch – United States and United Kingdom forces land in French North Africa.
 November 9 – WWII: U.S. serviceman Edward Leonski is hanged at Melbourne's Pentridge Prison for the "Brown-Out" murders of three women in May.
 November 12 – WWII – Battle of Guadalcanal: A naval battle near Guadalcanal starts between Japanese and American forces.
 November 13 – Battle of Guadalcanal: Aviators from the  sink the Japanese battleship Hiei.
 November 15 – The Battle of Guadalcanal ends: Although the United States Navy suffers heavy losses, it retains control of Guadalcanal.
 November 21 – The completion of the Alaska Highway (also known as the Alcan Highway) is celebrated (however, the "highway" is not usable by general vehicles until 1943).
 November 23 – A bill creating the United States Coast Guard Women's Reserve (SPARS) is signed into law.
 November 26 – The movie Casablanca premieres at the Hollywood Theater in New York City.
 November 28 – In Boston, Massachusetts, a fire in the Cocoanut Grove night club kills 491 people.
November 29 – Coffee rationing begins in the United States.

December
 December 1 – Gasoline rationing begins in the United States.
 December 2 – Manhattan Project: Below the bleachers of Stagg Field at the University of Chicago, a team led by Enrico Fermi initiates the first self-sustaining nuclear chain reaction (a coded message, "The Italian navigator has landed in the new world" is then sent to U.S. President Franklin D. Roosevelt).
 December 22 – In Aliquippa, Pennsylvania, an avalanche kills 26, including Vulcan Crucible Steel Co heir-apparent Samuel A. Stafford Sr., when two 100 ton boulders fall on a bus filled with wartime steel workers on their way home.

Ongoing
 World War II, U.S. involvement (1941–1945)

Unknown
 The Bernard Family Hall of North American Mammals opens in the American Museum of Natural History, with 10 dioramas

Births

January

 January 1
 Billy Lothridge, American football player (d. 1996)
 Country Joe McDonald, American musician (The "Fish" Cheer/I-Feel-Like-I'm-Fixin'-to-Die Rag)
 January 2
 Dennis Hastert, American politician
 Hugh Shelton, American military leader, Chairman of the Joint Chiefs of Staff
 January 3 – Donna Axum, American beauty pageant winner and model (d. 2018)
 January 4 – Jim Downing, race car driver and inventor
 January 5 – Charlie Rose, American television anchor and talk show host
 January 7
 Jim Lefebvre, baseball player and manager
 Danny Steinmann, director and screenwriter (d. 2012)
 January 9
 John Dunning, author
 Judy Malloy, poet and author
 January 11
 Clarence Clemons, African-American saxophonist (d. 2011)
 Leo Cullum, soldier, pilot, and cartoonist (d. 2010)
 George Mira, American football player
 January 17 – Muhammad Ali, born Cassius Clay, African-American boxer, activist, and philanthropist (d. 2016) 
 January 18 – Ruby Winters, American singer (d. 2016)
 January 24
 Melvin Fitting, logician
 Gary Hart, American wrestler and manager (d. 2008)
 January 25 – Carl Eller, American football player
 January 27
 John Witherspoon, American actor and comedian (d. 2019)
 Steve Wynn, American businessman and art collector
 January 30 – Marty Balin, American singer, songwriter, and musician (d. 2018)

February

 February 5 – Roger Staubach, American football player
 February 8 – Costen Shockley, American baseball player (d. 2022)
 February 9 – Carole King, American singer and composer
 February 10 – Howard Mudd, American offensive lineman & offensive line coach  (d. 2020)
 February 11
 Otis Clay, African-American R&B and soul singer (d. 2016)
 Leon Haywood, American funk and soul singer, songwriter and record producer (d. 2016)
 February 13
 Carol Lynley, American actress (d. 2019)
 Peter Tork, American musician and actor (d. 2019)
 Donald E. Williams, American astronaut (d. 2016)
 February 14 – Michael Bloomberg, American businessman
 February 15 – Sherry Jackson, American actress
 February 19 – Paul Krause, American football player
 February 20 – Mitch McConnell, American politician, United States Senator (R-KY)
 February 24 – Joe Lieberman, American politician, longtime Connecticut Senator (1989–2013)
 February 25 – Karen Grassle, American actress
 February 27 – Robert H. Grubbs, American chemist, Nobel Prize laureate (d. 2021)

March

 

 March 2
 John Irving, American author
 Lou Reed, American singer-songwriter and guitarist (d. 2013)
 March 7
 Tammy Faye Bakker, American evangelist, singer and television personality (d. 2007)
 Michael Eisner, American film studio executive
 March 8 –  Dick Allen, American baseball player (d. 2020)
 March 12 – Jimmy Wynn, American baseball player (d. 2020)
 March 13
 Dave Cutler, American software engineer
 Scatman John, singer and songwriter (d. 1999)
 March 17 – John Wayne Gacy, American serial killer (d. 1994)
 March 20 
 Earl Bramblett, American mass murderer (d. 2003)
 Peter Schjeldahl, American art critic and poet (d. 2022)
 March 21 – Willie Brown, American football player and coach (d. 2018)
 March 25 – Aretha Franklin, African-American singer, songwriter, actress, and civil rights activist (d. 2018)
 March 26 
 Erica Jong, American author
 Ronald Bass, American screenwriter and film producer
 March 28
 Jerry Sloan, American basketball coach (d. 2020)
 Daniel Dennett, American philosopher
 March 29
 Larry Pressler, U.S. Senator from South Dakota from 1979 to 1997
 Scott Wilson, American actor (d. 2018)

April

 April 1
 Chris Buttars, American politician (d. 2018) 
 Samuel R. Delany, American science fiction author
 April 2 – Leon Russell, singer-songwriter, keyboard player and guitarist (d. 2016)
 April 3 
 Marsha Mason, American actress
 Wayne Newton, American entertainer and singer
 Billy Joe Royal, American singer (d. 2015)
 April 5 – Peter Magowan, American businessman (d. 2019)
 April 6 – Barry Levinson, American film producer and director
 April 8 – Douglas Trumbull, American film director (d. 2022) 
 April 15
 Kenneth Lay, American businessman (d. 2006)
 Julie Sommars, American retired actress
 April 17 – Buster Williams, American jazz bassist
 April 23 – Sandra Dee, American actress (d. 2005)
 April 24
 Rege Ludwig, polo instructor and coach
 Barbra Streisand, American singer, actress, composer, and film director
 April 25 – Jon Kyl, U.S. Senator from Arizona from 1995 to 2013
 April 26 – Bobby Rydell, American singer (d. 2022) 
 April 27
 Ruth Glick, American writer
 Jim Keltner, American drummer

May

 May 1
 Stephen Macht, American actor
 Jean Saubert, American alpine ski racer (d. 2007)
 May 5 – Tammy Wynette, American country singer (d. 1998)
 May 6 – David Friesen, bassist 
 May 9 
 John Ashcroft, United States Attorney General
 Jerry Buchek, American baseball player (d. 2019)
 May 10
 Bill Coday, American musician and singer (d. 2008)
 Ingram Marshall, American composer
 Tommy Roe, American singer-songwriter
 May 14 – Byron Dorgan, American politician
 May 15 
 Anthony W. England, American astronaut
 Lois Johnson, American country music singer (d. 2014)
 K. T. Oslin, American country singer-songwriter (d. 2020)
 May 17 – Taj Mahal, African-American singer and guitarist
 May 19 – Gary Kildall, American computer scientist and microcomputer entrepreneur (d. 1994)
 May 20 – Carlos Hathcock, American Marine sniper (d. 1999)
 May 21 – Robert C. Springer, American astronaut and test pilot
 May 22
 Rich Garcia, American Major League Baseball umpire
 Ted Kaczynski, American mathematician, professor and murderer
 May 27
 Priscilla McLean, American composer, performer, video artist, writer, and music reviewer
 Lee Baca, American law enforcement official and convicted felon
 May 28 – Stanley B. Prusiner, American scientist, recipient of the Nobel Prize in Physiology or Medicine
 May 29 – Kevin Conway, American actor and director (d. 2020)
 May 31 – Happy Hairston, American basketball player (d. 2001)

June

 June 3 – Curtis Mayfield, African-American musician (d. 1999)
 June 7 
 Charles Boutin, lawyer and politician (d. 2021)
 David Walden, computer scientist (d. 2022)
 June 8
Chuck Negron, singer-songwriter and guitarist 
Andrew Weil, author and educator
 June 18 – Roger Ebert, film critic (d. 2013)
 June 19 – Bob Kasten, U.S. Senator from Wisconsin from 1981 to 1993
 June 20
 Richard I. Neal, military commander (d. 2022)
 Brian Wilson, American singer, composer and producer
 June 21 
 T. D. Little, American politician
 Marjorie Margolies, American politician
 Nicholas Santora, American criminal
 June 22 – George Banks, American spree killer
 June 24 – Michele Lee, American actress and singer
 June 25 
 Willis Reed, African-American basketball player, coach and general manager
 Richard Stephen Ritchie, U.S. military officer
 June 26
 J. J. Dillon, American professional wrestling manager
 Conrad C. Lautenbacher, U.S. Vice Admiral
 June 27 – Bruce Johnston, American singer and songwriter
 June 28 
 Jim Kolbe, American businessman and politician (d. 2022)
 Frank Zane, American professional bodybuilder and author

July

 July 1 – Andraé Crouch, American gospel singer (d. 2015)
 July 3 
 Willie Porter, American basketball player
 Lonnie Smith, American jazz musician (d. 2021)
 July 4
 Floyd Little, American football player and coach (d. 2021)
 Peter Rowan, American singer-songwriter and guitarist (Earth Opera and Old & In the Way)
 July 5 – Louise Shaffer, American actress, script writer, and author
 July 7 – Thomas D. Pollard, American educator, cell biologist and biophysicist
 July 8 – Phil Gramm, American politician
 July 9 – Richard Roundtree, African-American actor
 July 10 
 Ronnie James Dio, American musician (d. 2010)
 Sixto Rodriguez, American singer-songwriter
 July 12 – Steve Young, American country music singer-songwriter (d. 2016)
 July 13
 Harrison Ford, American actor and film producer
 Roger McGuinn, American musician (The Byrds)
 July 16 – John Purdin, American baseball player (d. 2010)
 July 18 – Bobby Susser, American songwriter and producer (d. 2020)
 July 19 – Frederick Kantor, American physicist (d. 2020)
 July 24 – Chris Sarandon, American actor
 July 27 – Dennis Ralston, American tennis player (d. 2020)
 July 28 
 Neilia Hunter Biden, first wife of Joe Biden (d. 1972)
 Marty Brennaman, sportscaster
 Henry Wessel Jr., photographer and educator (d. 2018)
 July 29 – Tony Sirico, American actor (d. 2022)

August

 August 1 – Jerry Garcia, American musician (d. 1995)
 August 4 
 Don S. Davis, American actor (d. 2008)
 Cleon Jones, American baseball player
 August 7
 Tobin Bell, American film and television actor
 Jane Fortune, American author, journalist, and philanthropist (d. 2018)
 Garrison Keillor, American writer and radio host
 August 9 
 Tommie Agee, American baseball player (d. 2001)
 Jack DeJohnette, American drummer, pianist, and composer
 August 10 – Speedy Duncan, American football player (d. 2021)
 August 11 – Otis Taylor, American football player (d. 2023)
 August 13 
 Arthur K. Cebrowski, American admiral (d. 2005)
 Robert L. Stewart, American brigadier and astronaut
 August 16 – Barbara George, American singer-songwriter (d. 2006)
 August 19 – Fred Thompson, American politician and actor (d. 2015)
 August 20 – Isaac Hayes, African-American singer and actor (d. 2008)
 August 23 – Nancy Richey, American tennis player
 August 24 – Max Cleland, American politician (d. 2021)
 August 27 – Daryl Dragon, American musician (d. 2019)
 August 29 – Sterling Morrison, American musician (d. 1995)

September

 September 1 – C. J. Cherryh, American fiction writer
 September 2 – Robert Shapiro, American lawyer and entrepreneur
 September 3 – Al Jardine, American musician 
 September 4 
 Raymond Floyd, American golfer
 Jerry Jarrett, American businessman and wrestling promoter (d. 2023)
 September 6
 Carol Wayne, American television and film actress (d. 1985)
 Mel McDaniel, American country music singer-songwriter (d. 2011)
 September 7 – Robert Godwin, murder victim (d. 2017)
 September 17 – Lupe Ontiveros, American actress (d. 2012)
 September 18 – Meredith Tax, American feminist writer and political activist (d. 2022)
 September 19 – Freda Payne, American singer and actress
 September 22
 Marlena Shaw, American jazz singer
 David Stern, American businessman and lawyer (d. 2020)
 September 29
 Madeline Kahn, American actress (d. 1999)
 Bill Nelson, American politician
 September 30 – Frankie Lymon, American singer (d. 1968)

October

 October 3 – Earl Hindman, American actor (d. 2003)
 October 6 – Fred Travalena, American comedian and impressionist (d. 2009)
 October 7
 Ronald Baecker, American computer scientist
 Joy Behar, American comedian and television personality
 October 10 – Janis Hansen, American singer and author (d. 2017)
 October 13 – Jerry Jones, American football team owner
 October 19 – Andrew Vachss, American author and attorney
 October 21 
 Hugh Dane, African-American actor (d. 2018)
 Judy Sheindlin, American retired judge turned television personality (Judge Judy)
 October 22
 Bobby Fuller, American rock singer, songwriter, and guitarist (d. 1966)
 Annette Funicello, American actress and singer (d. 2013)
 October 23 – Michael Crichton, American author (d. 2008)
 October 24
 Ruthann Aron, American politician
 Maggie Blye, American actress (d. 2016)
 Don Francis, American epidemiologist and virologist
 Don Gant, American singer-songwriter and producer (d. 1987)
 October 25 – Gloria Katz, American screenwriter and film producer (d. 2018)
 October 29
 James Orange, African-American pastor and civil rights activist (d. 2008)
 Bob Ross, American painter, art instructor and television host (d. 1995)
 October 31 – David Ogden Stiers, American actor and voice-over artist (d. 2018)

November

 November 1
 Larry Flynt, American publisher (Hustler) (d. 2021)
 Yolanda López, American painter (d. 2021)
 Michael Malone, American author (d. 2022)
 Marcia Wallace, American actress and comedian (d. 2013)
 Michael Zaslow, American actor (d. 1998)
 November 2
 Shere Hite, American-born German sexologist (d. 2020 in the United Kingdom)
 Stefanie Powers, American actress
 November 7 – Tom Peters, American writer
 November 10 – Robert F. Engle, American economist, Nobel Prize laureate
 November 17
 Bob Gaudio, American rock singer-songwriter
 Martin Scorsese, American film director
 November 18
 Linda Evans, American actress
 Susan Sullivan, American actress
 November 20
 Joe Biden, 46th President of the United States since 2021, 47th Vice President of the United States from 2009 to 2017 & U.S. Senator from Delaware from 1973 to 2009
 Bob Einstein, American actor, producer and screenwriter (d. 2019)
 November 21 – Al Matthews, African-American actor and singer (d. 2018)
 November 22 
 Dick Stockton, American sports announcer
 Guion Bluford, African-American astronaut
 November 23 – Susan Anspach, American actress (d. 2018)
 November 26 – Olivia Cole, American actress (d. 2018)
 November 27 – Jimi Hendrix, African-American rock singer-songwriter (d. 1970)
 November 28
 Eric Shinseki, American U.S. Army general
 Paul Warfield, American football player

December

 December 1 – John Clauser, American quantum physicist, Nobel Prize laureate
 December 4 – Al Hunt, American columnist 
 December 6 – Chelsea Brown, American actress (d. 2017)
 December 7
 Harry Chapin, American singer-songwriter (d. 1981)
 Reginald Lewis, American businessman (d. 1993)
 Peter Tomarken, American game-show host (d. 2006) 
 December 9 – Dick Butkus, American football player
 December 13 – Betty-Jean Maycock, American gymnast
 December 15 – Kathleen Blanco, American politician, 54th Governor of Louisiana (d. 2019)
 December 17 – Paul Butterfield, American musician (d. 1987)
 December 19 – Gene Okerlund, American wrestling announcer (d. 2019)
 December 20 
 Bob Hayes, African-American athlete (d. 2002)
 Michael P. Johnson, American sociologist
 December 21 – Carla Thomas, American singer
 December 27
 Muruga Booker, American drummer, composer, inventor, artist and recording artist
 Charmian Carr, American actress (d. 2016)
 Thomas Menino, 53rd Mayor of Boston, Massachusetts (d. 2014)
 December 29 – Gifford Pinchot III, management consultant
 December 30
 Betty Aberlin, American actress
 Allan Gotthelf, American philosopher (d. 2013)
 Michael Nesmith, American pop musician, songwriter, actor, producer, businessman and philanthropist (d. 2021)

Deaths 
January 3 – Charles Mann Hamilton, politician (b. 1874)
January 4
Mel Sheppard, Olympic track athlete (b. 1883)
Otis Skinner, stage actor (b. 1858)
January 6 – John Bernard Flannagan, sculptor, suicide (b. 1895)
January 16 – Carole Lombard, film actress, air crash (b. 1908)
January 18 – James P. Parker, U.S. Navy commodore (b. 1855)
January 18 – Mason Patrick, Chief of United States Air Service, American Expeditionary Forces 1918 (b. 1863)
February 9 – Anna Elizabeth Klumpke, portrait and genre painter (b. 1856)
February 12 – Grant Wood, painter (b. 1892)
February 18 – Albert Payson Terhune, journalist and author (b. 1872)
March 16 – Rachel Field, author and poet (born 1894)
March 26 – Carolyn Wells, prolific novelist and poet (b. 1862)
April 18 – Gertrude Vanderbilt Whitney, founder of the Whitney Museum of American Art (b. 1875)
April 27 – Arthur L. Bristol, U.S. Navy admiral (b. 1886)
May 29 – John Barrymore, actor (b. 1882)
June 4 – killed in action at the Battle of Midway
William Abercrombie, U.S. Navy officer and aviator (b. 1914)
Edgar R. Bassett, U.S. Navy officer (b. 1914)
Robert Boyd Brazier, US Navy aviation radioman, killed in action at the Battle of Midway (b. 1916)
John Clarence Butler, US Navy officer, killed in action at the Battle of Midway (b. 1921)
Harold John Ellison, U.S. Navy officer (b. 1917)
Eugene A. Greene, US Navy officer, killed in action at the Battle of Midway (b. 1921)
John William Haas, US Navy pilot, killed in action at the Battle of Midway (b. 1907)
Patrick H. Hart, US Navy officer, killed in action at the Battle of Midway (b. 1915)
Lofton R. Henderson, U.S. Marine Corps aviator and commanding officer of Marine Scout Bomber Squadron 241 (VMSB-241) (b. 1903)
Ernest Lenard Hilbert, US Navy aviator, killed in action at the Battle of Midway (b. 1920)
Curtis W. Howard, US Navy officer, killed in action at the Battle of Midway (b. 1917)
Charles Kleinsmith, US Navy Chief Petty officer and sailor, killed in action at the Battle of Midway (b. 1904)
Eugene E. Lindsey, US Navy officer, killed in action at the Battle of Midway (b. 1905)
Lance Edward Massey, US Navy pilot, killed in action at the Battle of Midway (b. 1909)
Walter Harold Mosley, US Navy officer, killed in action at the Battle of Midway (b. 1916)
Carl A. Osberg, US Navy pilot, killed in action at the Battle of Midway (b. 1920)
Floyd B. Parks, US Marine Corps officer, killed in action at the Battle of Midway (b. 1911)
Oswald A. Powers, US Navy officer, killed in action at the Battle of Midway (b. 1915)
David John Roche, US Navy officer, killed in action at the Battle of Midway (b. 1918)
Richard Wayne Suesens, US Navy officer, killed in action at the Battle of Midway (b. 1915)
John C. Waldron, U.S. Navy aviator and commander of Torpedo Squadron 8 (b. 1900)
Frederick T. Weber, US Navy aviator, killed in action at the Battle of Midway (b. 1916)
Osborne B. Wiseman, US Navy aviator, killed in action at the Battle of Midway (b. 1915)
June 5 
Samuel Adams, US Navy officer, killed in action at the Battle of Midway (b. 1912)
Virginia Lee Corbin, silent film actress (b. 1910)
Royal R. Ingersoll II, US Navy officer, killed in action at the Battle of Midway (b. 1913)
June 19 – Frank Irons, Olympic field athlete (b. 1886)
June 23 – William Couper, sculptor (b. 1853)
June 30 – William Henry Jackson, explorer and photographer (b. 1843)
July 30 – Jimmy Blanton, African American jazz double bassist (b. 1918)
August 3 – James Cruze, actor and director (b. 1884)
August 7 
Louis J. Carpellotti, U.S. marine, killed in action (b. 1918)
Charles E. Ford, film director and producer (b. 1899)
August 30 – John Willard, playwright and actor (b. 1885)
September 7 – Cecilia Beaux, portrait painter (b. 1855)
October 5 – Dorothea Klumpke, astronomer (b. 1861)
November 4 – Eleanor Stackhouse Atkinson, novelist and textbook and children's writer (b. 1863)
December 5 – Richard Tucker, film actor (b. 1884)
December 6 – Amos Rusie, baseball player (b. 1871)
December 7 – Orland Steen Loomis, Governor of Wisconsin (b. 1893)
December 8 – Albert Kahn, architect (b. 1869 in Germany)
December 12
Helen Gilman Noyes Brown, philanthropist (b. 1867)
Helen Westley, character actress (b. 1875)
December 13 – Robert Robinson Taylor, first accredited African American architect (b. 1868)
December 21 – Franz Boas, anthropologist (b. 1858 in Germany)
December 27 – William G. Morgan, inventor of volleyball  (b. 1870)

See also
 List of American films of 1942
 Timeline of United States history (1930–1949)
 Timeline of World War II

References

External links
 

 
1940s in the United States
United States
United States
Years of the 20th century in the United States